Méreau is a commune in France.

Méreau may also refer to:
Méreau (token), used in France during the Late Middle Ages and Reformation

People with the surname
Sophie Mereau (1770–1806), German writer

See also
 Méreaux (disambiguation)